Nebria roborowskii is a species of ground beetle in the Nebriinae subfamily that is endemic to China and can be found in such provinces as Gansu, Qinghai and Tibet.

References

roborowskii
Beetles described in 1889
Beetles of Asia
Endemic fauna of China